Chester-le-Street, is a market town and civil parish in County Durham, England, around  north of Durham and also close to Sunderland and Newcastle upon Tyne. It is located on the River Wear, which runs out to sea at Sunderland to the east. The town holds markets on Tuesdays, Fridays and Saturdays.

The town's history is ancient, records go back to a Roman-built fort called Concangis. The Roman fort is the "Chester" (from the Latin castra) of the town's name; the "Street" refers to the paved Roman road that ran north–south through the town, now the route called Front Street. The parish church of St Mary and St Cuthbert is where the body of Anglo-Saxon St Cuthbert remained for 112 years before being transferred to Durham Cathedral and site of the first Gospels translation into English, Aldred writing the Old English gloss between the lines of the Lindisfarne Gospels there.

From 1894 until 2009, local government districts were governed from the town. From 1894 to 1974 it had a rural district, which covered the town and outlying villages. In 1909 the inner rural district formed an urban district, which covered the town as it was at that time. By 1974 the town expanded out of the urban district, during that year's reforms the urban and rural districts as well as other areas formed a non-metropolitan district. It was abolished in 2009 reforms when the non-metropolitan county became a unitary authority.

History

Name 
The Romans founded a fort named Concangis or Concagium, which was a Latinisation of the original Celtic name for the area, which also gave name to the waterway through the town, Cong Burn. The precise name is uncertain as it does not appear in Roman records, but Concangis is the name most cited today. Although a meaning "Place of the horse people" has been given, scholarly authorities consider the meaning of the name obscure.

Old English forms of the name include Cuneceastra and Conceastre, which takes its first two syllables from the Roman name, with the addition of the Old English word ceaster 'Roman fortification'. The Universal etymological English dictionary of 1749 gives the town as "Chester upon Street" (and describes it as "a Village in the Bishoprick of Durham"). At some point this was shortened to the modern form.

Town biography 
There is evidence of Iron Age use of the River Wear near the town, but the history of Chester-le-Street starts with the Roman fort of Concangis. This was built alongside the Roman road Cade's Road (now Front Street) and close to the River Wear, around 100 A.D., and was occupied until the Romans left Britain in 410 A.D. At the time the Wear was navigable to at least Concangis, and may also have provided food for the garrisons stationed there.

After the Romans left there is no record of who lived there (apart from some wounded soldiers from wars who had to live there), until 883 when a group of monks, driven out of Lindisfarne seven years earlier, stopped there to build a wooden shrine and church to St Cuthbert, whose body they had borne with them. While they were there the town was the centre of Christianity for much of the northeast, because it was the seat of the Bishop of Lindisfarne, making the church a cathedral. There the monks translated into English the Lindisfarne Gospels, which they had brought with them. They stayed for 112 years, leaving in 995 for the safer and more permanent home at Durham.  The title has been revived as the Roman Catholic titular see of Cuncacestre.

The church was rebuilt in stone in 1054, and despite the loss of its bishopric seems to have retained a degree of wealth and influence. In 1080 most of the huts in the town were burned and many people killed in retaliation for the death of William Walcher, the first prince-bishop, at the hands of an English mob. After this devastation wrought by the Normans the region was left out of the Domesday Book; there was little left to record, and the region was by then being run from Durham by the prince-bishops so held little interest for London.

Cade's Road did not fall out of use but was hidden beneath later roads which became the Great North Road, the main route from London and the south to Newcastle and Edinburgh. The town's location on the road played a significant role in its development, as well as its name, as inns sprang up to cater for the travelling trade: both riders and horses needed to rest on journeys usually taking days to complete. This trade reached a peak in the early 19th century as more and more people and new mail services were carried by stagecoach, before falling off with the coming of the railways. The town was bypassed when the A167 was routed around the town, and this was later supplanted by the faster A1(M).

The coal industry also left its mark on the town. From the late 17th century onwards coal was dug in increasing quantities in the region. Mining was centred around the rivers, for transportation by sea to other parts of the country, and Chester-le-Street was at the centre of the coal being dug and shipped away down the Wear, so a centre of coal related communication and commerce. At the same time the growth of the mines and the influx of miners supported local businesses, not just the many inns but new shops and services, themselves bringing in more people to work in them. These people would later work in new industries established in the town to take advantage of its good communications and access to raw materials.

One of the most tragic episodes in the town's history and that of the coal industry in NE England occurred during a miners' strike during the winter of 1811/12. Collieries owned by the Dean and Chapter of Durham Cathedral were brought to a standstill by the strike, causing much hardship amongst the people of the town. The strike was broken on New Year's Day, 1 January 1812, when the Bishop of Durham, Shute Barrington, sent a detachment of troops from Durham Castle to force a return to work. It is thought that this uncharacteristic act by Barrington was due to pressure from the national government in Westminster who were concerned that the strike was affecting industrial output of essential armaments for the Napoleonic Wars. 

On the evening of 5 October 1936 the Jarrow Marchers stopped at the town centre after their first day's walk. The church hall was used to house them before they continued onward the following day.

Climate

The town has a mild climate and gets well below average rainfall relative to the UK. It does though experience occasional floods. To the east of the town lies the Riverside cricket ground and Riverside Park. They were built on the flood plains of the River Wear, and are often flooded when the river bursts its banks. The town centre is subject to occasional flash flooding, usually after very heavy rain over the town and surrounding areas, if the rain falls too quickly for it to be drained away by Cong Burn. The flooding occurs at the bottom of Front Street where the Cong Burn passes under the street, after it was enclosed in concrete in 1932.

Landmarks

John Leland described Chester-le-Street in the 1530s as "Chiefly one main street of very mean building in height.", a sentiment echoed by Daniel Defoe.

Chester Burn viaduct

The viaduct to the northwest of the town centre was completed in 1868 for the North Eastern Railway, to enable trains to travel at high speed on a more direct route between Newcastle and Durham. It is over 230m long with 11 arches, now spanning a road and supermarket car-park, and is a Grade II listed structure.

Lumley Castle
Lumley Castle was built in 1389. It is on the eastern bank of the River Wear and overlooks the town and the Riverside Park.

The Queens Head Hotel
The Queens Head Hotel is located in the central area of the Front Street. It was built over 250 years ago when Front Street formed part of the main route from Edinburgh and Newcastle to London and the south of England. A Grade II listed building, it is set back from the street and is still one of the largest buildings in the town centre.

The Post Office

Chester-le-Street Post Office at 137 Front Street is in Art Deco style and replaced a smaller building located on the corner of Relton Terrace and Ivanhoe Terrace. It opened in 1936 and is unusual in that it is one of a handful of post offices that display the royal cypher from the brief reign of Edward VIII.

Religious sites

St Mary and St Cuthbert church

St Mary and St Cuthbert church possesses a rare surviving anchorage, one of the best-preserved in the country. It was built for an anchorite, an extreme form of hermit. His or her walled-up cell had only a slit to observe the altar and an opening for food, while outside was an open grave for when the occupant died. It was occupied by six anchorites from 1383 to c. 1538, and is now a museum known as the Anker's House. The north aisle is occupied by a line of Lumley family effigies, only five genuine, assembled circa 1590. Some have been chopped off to fit and resemble a casualty station at Agincourt, according to Sir Simon Jenkins in his England's Thousand Best Churches. This and Lumley Castle are Chester-le-Street's only Grade I listed buildings.

Bethel United Reformed Church

The small United Reformed Church on Low Chare, just off the main Front Street, was built in 1814 as the Bethel Congregational Chapel and remodelled in 1860. It is still in use and is a Grade II listed building.

Sport

Cricket
The Riverside Ground, known for sponsorship reasons as the Seat Unique Riverside, is home to Durham County Cricket Club which became a first class county in 1992. Since 1999, the ground has hosted many international fixtures, usually involving the England cricket team. The ground was also host to two fixtures at the 1999 Cricket World Cup, and three fixtures at the 2019 Cricket World Cup.
The town also has its own cricket club, Chester-le-Street Cricket Club based at the Ropery Lane ground. They are the current Champions of the North East Premier League, won the national ECB 45 over tournament in 2009 and reached the quarter final of the national 20/20 club championship in 2009.

Rowing

Chester-le-Street Amateur Rowing Club is based on the River Wear near the Riverside cricket ground and has been there for over 100 years. During the summer months the club operate mainly on the river, but in the winter move to indoor sessions during the evenings and use the river at weekends.

The club has over 160 members of which 90 are junior members, with numbers increasing annually. The club are well thought of by British Rowing as a lead club for junior development with many juniors now competing at GB level, and some competing for GB at international events.

Football
Medieval football was once played in the town. The game was played annually on Shrove Tuesday between the "Upstreeters" and "Downstreeters". Play started at 1 pm and finished at 6 pm. To start the game, the ball was thrown from a window in the centre of the town and in one game more than 400 players took part. The centre of the street was the dividing line and the winner was the side where the ball was (Up or Down) at 6 pm. It was played from the Middle Ages until 1932, when it was outlawed by the police and people trying to carry on the tradition were arrested.  Chester-le-Street Town F.C. were founded in 1972 and compete in the Northern Football League Division Two.

Transport

Road
At the time of the football matches 'Front Street' was actually the A1 road from London to Edinburgh. A bypass was built in the 1950s, which still exists today as the A167. The bypass road itself was partly bypassed by, and partly incorporated in, the A1(M) motorway in the 1970s.

The northern end of Front Street used to be the start of the A6127, which is the road that would continue through Birtley, Gateshead, and eventually over the Tyne Bridge and become the A6127(M) central motorway in Newcastle upon Tyne. However, when the Gateshead-Newcastle Western Bypass of the A1(M) was opened, many roads in this area were renumbered, following the convention that roads originating between single digit A roads take their first digit from the single digit A road in an anticlockwise direction from their point of origin, and Newcastle Road, which was formerly designated A1, is now unclassified. The A6127 was renamed the A167. Car traffic is now banned from the northern part of Front Street and it is restricted to buses, cyclists and delivery vehicles for the shops.

Rail

Chester-le-Street railway station, on the East Coast Main Line of the National Rail network, between Newcastle and Durham, opened in 1868. It offers local connections and cross-country train services. , train operators serving the station are CrossCountry, TransPennine Express and Northern.

A local independent company, Chester-le-Track, has operated the station since 1999, as an agent for Arriva Trains Northern and Northern Rail, but ceased trading from close of business on Saturday 31 March 2018. The station is now staffed on a part-time basis by Northern Rail.

The town is mentioned in the 1963 song "Slow Train" by Flanders and Swann: No churns, no porter, no cat on a seat,
At Chorlton-cum-Hardy or Chester-le-Street.

Bus
The town is the original home of The Northern General Transport [Bus] Company, nowadays Go North East, and the company still operates from the Picktree Lane Depot. It also pioneered the use of Minilink bus services in the North East in 1985.

Education

Primary schools
 Cestria Primary School
 Bullion Lane Primary School
 Woodlea Primary School
 Lumley Junior and Infant School
 Newker Primary School
 Red Rose Primary School
 Chester-le-Street CE Primary School
 St Cuthbert's RCVA Primary School

Secondary schools
 Park View School
 Hermitage Academy

Notable people

 Michael Barron, footballer
 Aidan Chambers, children's author, Carnegie Medal and Hans Christian Andersen Award winner
 William Browell Charlton, trade union leader, Durham County Colliery Enginemen's Association, National Federation of Colliery Enginemen and Boiler Firemen 
 Ellie Crisell, journalist and television presenter
 Ronnie Dodd, footballer
 Danny Graham, footballer
 Andrew Hayden-Smith, actor and presenter
 Grant Leadbitter, footballer
 Sheila Mackie, artist
 Jock Purdon, folk singer and poet
 Adam Reach, footballer
 Bryan Robson, former England football captain, and his brothers Justin and Gary, also footballers
 Gavin Sutherland, conductor and pianist
 Colin Todd, football manager and former England international player
 Olga and Betty Turnbull, child entertainers of the 1930s who performed for royalty
 Kevin "Geordie" Walker, guitarist of post-punk group Killing Joke
 Peter Ward, footballer
 Bruce Welch of pop group The Shadows

Twin Town
It is twinned with:
 Kamp-Lintfort in Germany.

Notes

References

Bibliography

External links

 Chester-le-Live community website
 Chester-le-Street Heritage Trail 
 Chester-le-Street Heritage Group
 Durham In Time – Chester-Le-Street Heritage Group 
 

 
Towns in County Durham
Market towns in County Durham
Unparished areas in County Durham